I'm Still in the Night is the third and first major label EP by Salem. The EP was released in digital download and vinyl. The release was limited to 500 copies, like almost all the band's previous releases. The EP itself is a compilation of demos, b-sides and unreleased material from the band's debut album King Night (2010).

Track listing
"I'm Still in the Night" – 3:03
"Better Off Alone" – 7:09
"Krawl" – 2:58
"Baby Ratta" – 3:29

References

2011 EPs
Iamsound Records albums
Salem (American band) albums
Electronic EPs